The economy of Croatia is a high-income, service-based social market economy with the tertiary sector accounting for 70% of total gross domestic product (GDP). 
Croatia has a fully integrated and globalized economy. Croatia's road to globalization started as soon as the country gained independence, with tourism as one of the country's core industries dependent on the global market. Croatia joined the World Trade Organization in 2000, NATO in 2009, has been a member of the European Union since 1 July 2013, and it finally joined the Eurozone and the Schengen Area on January 1st 2023. Croatia is also negotiating membership of OECD organization, which it hopes to join by 2025. Further integration into the EU structures will continue in the coming years, including participation in ESA, CERN as well as EEA membership in the next 24 months.

With its entry into the Eurozone, Croatia is now classified as a developed country or an  advanced economy, a designation given by the IMF to highly developed industrial nations, which includes all members of the Eurozone. 

Croatia was hit by  2008 global financial crisis really hard which affected Croatian economy with a  significant downturn in economic growth as well as progress in economic reform which resulted in six years of recession and a cumulative decline in GDP of 12.5%. Croatia formally emerged from the recession in the fourth quarter of 2014, and had continuous GDP growth until 2020. The Croatian economy reached pre crisis levels in 2019, but due to the Coronavirus pandemic GDP decreased by 8.4% in 2020. Growth rebounded in 2021 and Croatia recorded its largest year-over-year GDP growth since 1991.

Croatia's post-pandemic recovery was supported by strong private consumption, better-than-expected performance in the tourism industry, and a boom in merchandise exports. Croatian exports in 2021 and 2022 saw rapid growth of nearly 25% and 26% respectively, with exports in 2021 reaching 143.7 billion kuna and exports in 2022 expanding further by 26% to reach projected 182 billion kuna.   Croatian Economy also saw continuation of rapid economic growth based on good tourism receipts and export numbers, as well as rapidly expanding ICT sector which saw rapid growth and revenue that rival Croatian Tourism. ICT sector alone is generating €7 billion of service exports and it is expected to expand further in 2023 and 2024 at an average of 15%.

In 2022, Croatian economy is expected to grow between 5.9 and 7.8% in real terms and it is expected to reach between $72 and $73.6 billion according to preliminary estimates by Croatian Government surpassing early estimates of 491 billion kuna or $68.5 billion. Croatian Purchasing Power Parity in 2022 for the first time should exceed $40 000, however considering Croatian economy experienced 6 years of deep recession, catching up will take several more years of high growth. Economic outlook for 2023 for Croatian economy are mixed, depends largely on how the big Eurozone economies perform, Croatia's largest trading partners; Italy, Germany, Austria,  Slovenia and France are expected to slow down, but avoid recession according to latest economic projections and estimates, so Croatian economy as a result could see better then expected results in 2023,  early projections of between 1 and 2.6% economic growth in 2023 with inflation at 7% is a significant slow down for the country,however country is experiencing major internal and inward investment cycle unparalleled in recent history. EU recovery funds  in tune of €8.7 billion coupled with large EU investments in recently earthquake affected areas of Croatia, as well as major investments by local business in to renewable energy sector, also EU supported and funded, as well as major investments in transport infrastructure and rapidly expanding Croatia's ICT sector, Croatian economy could see continuation of rapid growth in 2023.    

Tourism is one of the main pillars of the Croatian economy, comprising 19.6% of Croatia's GDP. Croatia is working to become an energy powerhouse with its floating liquefied natural gas (LNG) regasification terminal on the island of Krk and investments in green energy, particularly wind energy, solar and geothermal energy, having opened 17 MW  geothermal power plant in Ciglena in late 2019, that is the largest power plant in continental Europe with binary technology and starting the work on the second one in the summer of 2021.  The government intends to spend about $1.4 billion on grid modernisation, with a goal of increasing renewable energy source connections by at least 800 MW by 2026 and 2,500 MW by 2030 and predicts that renewable energy resources as a share of total energy consumption will grow to 36.4% in 2030, and to 65.6% in 2050.

In 2021 Croatia joined the list of countries with its own automobile industry, with Rimac Automobili's Nevera started being produced. The company also took over Bugatti Automobiles in November same year and started building its new HQ in Zagreb, titled as the ‘Rimac Campus’, that will serve as the company’s international research and development (R&D) and production base for all future Rimac products, as well as home of R&D for future Bugatti models. The company also plans to build battery systems for different manufacturers from the automotive industry

This campus will also become the home of R&D for future Bugatti models due to the new joint venture, though these vehicles will be built at Bugatti’s Molsheim plant in France.

On Friday, 12 November 2021 Fitch raised Croatia's credit rating by one level, from ‘BBB-‘ to ‘BBB’, Croatia's highest credit rating in history, with a positive outlook, noting progress in preparations for euro area membership and a strong recovery of the Croatian economy from the pandemic crisis.

In late March 2022 Croatian Bureau of Statistics announced that Croatia's industrial output rose by 4% in February, thus growing for 15 months in a row. Croatia continued to have strong growth during 2022 fuelled by tourism revenue and increased exports. According to a preliminary estimate, Croatia's GDP in Q2 grew by 7.7% from the same period of 2021. The International Monetary Fund (IMF) projected in early September 2022 that Croatia's economy will expand by 5.9% in 2022, whilst EBRD expects Croatian GDP growth to reach 6.5% by the end of 2022. Pfizer announced launching a new production plant in Savski Marof whilst Croatian IT industry grew 3.3% confirming the trend that started with Coronavirus pandemic where the Croatia's digital economy increased by 16 percent on average annually from 2019 to 2021, and by 2030 its value could reach 15 percent of GDP, with the ICT sector the main driver of that growth.

Croatia joined both the Eurozone and Schengen Area in January 2023 which helps strengthen the country’s integration into the European economy and make cross border trade with both European countries and European trade partners easier. The minimum wage is expected to rise to NET 700 EUR in 2023, further increasing consumer spending and combating the high inflation rate.

History

Pre-1990

When Croatia was still part of the Dual Monarchy, its economy was largely agricultural. However, modern industrial companies were also located in the vicinity of the larger cities. The Kingdom of Croatia had a high ratio of population working in agriculture. Many industrial branches developed in that time, like forestry and wood industry (stave fabrication, the production of potash, lumber mills, shipbuilding). The most profitable one was stave fabrication, the boom of which started in the 1820s with the clearing of the oak forests around Karlovac and Sisak and again in the 1850s with the marshy oak masses along the Sava and Drava rivers. Shipbuilding in Croatia played a huge role in the 1850s Austrian Empire, especially the long-range sailing boats. Sisak and Vukovar were the centres of river-shipbuilding. Slavonia was also mostly an agricultural land and it was known for its silk production. Agriculture and the breeding of cattle were the most profitable occupations of the inhabitants. It produced corn of all kinds, hemp, flax, tobacco, and great quantities of liquorice.

The first steps towards industrialization began in the 1830s and in the following decades the construction of big industrial enterprises took place. During the 2nd half of the 19th and early 20th century there was an upsurge of industry in Croatia, strengthened by the construction of railways and the electric-power production. However, the industrial production was still lower than agricultural production. Regional differences were high. Industrialization was faster in inner Croatia than in other regions, while Dalmatia remained one of the poorest provinces of Austria-Hungary. The slow rate of modernization and rural overpopulation caused extensive emigration, particularly from Dalmatia. According to estimates, roughly 400,000 Croats emigrated from Austria-Hungary between 1880 and 1914. In 1910 8.5% of the population of Croatia-Slavonia lived in urban settlements.

In 1918 Croatia became part of the Kingdom of Yugoslavia, which was in the interwar period one of the least developed countries in Europe. Most of its industry was based in Slovenia and Croatia, but further industrial development was modest and centered on textile mills, sawmills, brick yards and food-processing plants. The economy was still traditionally based on agriculture and raising of livestock, with peasants accounting for more than half of Croatia's population.

In 1941 the Independent State of Croatia (NDH), a World War II puppet state of Germany and Italy, was established in parts of Axis-occupied Yugoslavia. The economic system of NDH was based on the concept of "Croatian socialism". The main characteristic of the new system was the concept of a planned economy with high levels of state involvement in economic life. The fulfillment of basic economic interests was primarily ensured with measures of repression. All large companies were placed under state control and the property of the regime's national enemies was nationalized. Its currency was the NDH kuna. The Croatian State Bank was the central bank, responsible for issuing currency. As the war progressed the government kept printing more money and its amount in circulation was rapidly increasing, resulting in high inflation rates.

After World War II, the new Communist Party of Yugoslavia resorted to a command economy on the Soviet model of rapid industrial development. In accordance with the socialist plan, mainly companies in the pharmaceutical industry, the food industry and the consumer goods industry were founded in Croatia. Metal and heavy industry was mainly promoted in Bosnia and Serbia. By 1948 almost all domestic and foreign-owned capital had been nationalized. The industrialization plan relied on high taxation, fixed prices, war reparations, Soviet credits, and export of food and raw materials. Forced collectivization of agriculture was initiated in 1949. At that time 94% of agricultural land was privately owned, and by 1950 96% was under the control of the social sector. A rapid improvement of food production and the standard of living was expected, but due to bad results the program was abandoned three years later.

Throughout the 1950s Croatia experienced rapid urbanization. Decentralization came in 1965 and spurred growth of several sectors including the prosperous tourist industry. SR Croatia was, after SR Slovenia, the second most developed republic in Yugoslavia with a ~55% higher GDP per capita than the Yugoslav average, generating 31.5% of Yugoslav GDP or $30.1Bn in 1990. Croatia and Slovenia accounted for nearly half of the total Yugoslav GDP, and this was reflected in the overall standard of living. In the mid-1960s, Yugoslavia lifted emigration restrictions and the number of emigrants increased rapidly. In 1971 224,722 workers from Croatia were employed abroad, mostly in West Germany. Foreign remittances contributed $2 billion annually to the economy by 1990. Profits gained through Croatia's industry were used to develop poor regions in other parts of former Yugoslavia, leading to Croatia contributing much more to the federal Yugoslav economy than it gained in return. This, coupled with austerity programs and hyperinflation in the 1980s, led to discontent in both Croatia and Slovenia which eventually fuelled political movements calling for independence.

Transition and war years

In the late 1980s and early 1990s, with the collapse of socialism and the beginning of economic transition, Croatia faced considerable economic problems stemming from:
 the legacy of longtime communist mismanagement of the economy;
 damage during the internecine fighting to bridges, factories, power lines, buildings, and houses;
 the large refugee and displaced population, both Croatian and Bosnian;
 the disruption of economic ties; and
 mishandled privatization

At the time Croatia gained independence, its economy (and the whole Yugoslavian economy) was in the middle of recession. Privatization under the new government had barely begun when war broke out in 1991. As a result of the Croatian War of Independence, infrastructure sustained massive damage in the period 1991–92, especially the revenue-rich tourism industry. Privatization in Croatia and transformation from a planned economy to a market economy was thus slow and unsteady, largely as a result of public mistrust when many state-owned companies were sold to politically well-connected at below-market prices. With the end of the war, Croatia's economy recovered moderately, but corruption, cronyism, and a general lack of transparency stymied economic reforms and foreign investment. The privatization of large government-owned companies was practically halted during the war and in the years immediately following the conclusion of peace. As of 2000, roughly 70% of Croatia's major companies were still state-owned, including water, electricity, oil, transportation, telecommunications, and tourism.

The early 1990s were characterized by high inflation rates. In 1991 the Croatian dinar was introduced as a transitional currency, but inflation continued to accelerate. The anti-inflationary stabilization steps in 1993 decreased retail price inflation from a monthly rate of 38.7% to 1.4%, and by the end of the year, Croatia experienced deflation. In 1994 Croatia introduced the kuna as its currency.

As a result of the macro-stabilization programs, the negative growth of GDP during the early 1990s stopped and turned into a positive trend. Post-war reconstruction activity provided another impetus to growth. Consumer spending and private sector investments, both of which were postponed during the war, contributed to the growth in 1995–1997. Croatia began its independence with a relatively low external debt because the debt of Yugoslavia was not shared among its former republics at the beginning. In March 1995 Croatia agreed with the Paris Club of creditor governments and took 28.5% of Yugoslavia's previously non-allocated debt over 14 years. In July 1996 an agreement was reached with the London Club of commercial creditors, when Croatia took 29.5% of Yugoslavia's debt to commercial banks. In 1997 around 60 percent of Croatia's external debt was inherited from former Yugoslavia.

At the beginning of 1998 value-added tax was introduced. The central government budget was in surplus in that year, most of which was used to repay foreign debt. Government debt to GDP had fallen from 27.30% to 26.20% at the end of 1998. However, the consumer boom was disrupted in mid 1998, as a result of the bank crisis when 14 banks went bankrupt. Unemployment increased and GDP growth slowed down to 1.9%. The recession that began at the end of 1998 continued through most of 1999, and after a period of expansion GDP in 1999 had a negative growth of −0.9%. In 1999 the government tightened its fiscal policy and revised the budget with a 7% cut in spending.

In 1999 the private sector share in GDP reached 60%, which was significantly lower than in other former socialist countries. After several years of successful macroeconomic stabilization policies, low inflation and a stable currency, economists warned that the lack of fiscal changes and the expanding role of the state in the economy caused the decline in the late 1990s and were preventing sustainable economic growth.

Economy since 2000
The new government led by the president of SDP, Ivica Račan, carried out a number of structural reforms after it won the parliamentary elections on 3 January 2000. The country emerged from the recession in the 4th quarter of 1999 and growth picked up in 2000. Due to overall increase in stability, the economic rating of the country improved and interest rates dropped. Economic growth in the 2000s was stimulated by a credit boom led by newly privatized banks, capital investment, especially in road construction, a rebound in tourism and credit-driven consumer spending. Inflation remained tame and the currency, the kuna, stable.

In 2000 Croatia generated 5,899 billion kunas in total income from the shipbuilding sector, which employed 13,592 people. Total exports in 2001 amounted to $4,659,286,000, of which 54.7% went to the countries of the EU. Croatia's total imports were $9,043,699,000, 56% of which originated from the EU.

Unemployment reached its peak in late 2002, but has since been steadily declining. In 2003, the nation's economy would officially recover to the amount of GDP it had in 1990. In late 2003 the new government led by HDZ took over the office. Unemployment continued falling, powered by growing industrial production and rising GDP, rather than only seasonal changes from tourism. Unemployment reached an all-time low in 2008 when the annual average rate was 8.6%, GDP per capita peaked at $16,158, while public debt as percentage of GDP decreased to 29%. Most economic indicators remained positive in this period except for the external debt as Croatian firms focused more on empowering the economy by taking loans from foreign resources. Between 2003 and 2007, Croatia's private-sector share of GDP increased from 60% to 70%.

The Croatian National Bank had to take steps to curb further growth of indebtedness of local banks with foreign banks. The dollar debt figure is quite adversely affected by the EUR/USD ratio—over a third of the increase in debt since 2002 is due to currency value changes.

2009–2015
Economic growth has been hurt by the global financial crisis. Immediately after the crisis it seemed that Croatia did not suffer serious consequences like some other countries. However, in 2009, the crisis gained momentum and the decline in GDP growth, at a slower pace, continued during 2010. In 2011 the GDP stagnated as the growth rate was zero. Since the global crisis hit the country, the unemployment rate has been steadily increasing, resulting in the loss of more than 100,000 jobs. While unemployment was 9.6% in late 2007, in January 2014 it peaked at 22.4%. In 2010 Gini coefficient was 0,32. In September 2012, Fitch ratings agency unexpectedly improved Croatia's economic outlook from negative to stable, reaffirming Croatia's current BBB rating. The slow pace of privatization of state-owned businesses and an over-reliance on tourism have also been a drag on the economy.

Croatia joined the European Union on 1 July 2013 as the 28th member state. The Croatian economy is heavily interdependent on other principal economies of Europe, and any negative trends in these larger EU economies also have a negative impact on Croatia. Italy, Germany and Slovenia are Croatia's most important trade partners. In spite of the rather slow post-recession recovery, in terms of income per capita it is still ahead of some European Union member states such as Bulgaria, and Romania. In terms of average monthly wage, Croatia is ahead of 9 EU members (Czech Republic, Estonia, Slovakia, Latvia, Poland, Hungary, Lithuania, Romania, and Bulgaria).

The annual average unemployment rate in 2014 was 17.3% and Croatia has the third-highest unemployment rate in the European Union, after Greece (26.5%), and Spain (24.%). Of particular concern is the heavily backlogged judiciary system, combined with inefficient public administration, especially regarding the issues of land ownership and corruption in the public sector. Unemployment is regionally uneven: it is very high in eastern and southern parts of the country, nearing 20% in some areas, while relatively low in the north-west and in larger cities, where it is between 3 and 7%. In 2015 external debt rose by 2.7 billion euros since the end of 2014 and is now around €49.3 billion.

2016–2020
During 2015 the Croatian economy started with slow but upward economic growth, which continued during 2016 and conclusive at the end of the year seasonally adjusted was recorded at 3.5%. The better than expected figures during 2016 enabled the Croatian Government and with more tax receipts enabled the repayment of debt as well as narrow the current account deficit during Q3 and Q4 of 2016 This growth in economic output, coupled with the reduction of government debt has made a positive impact on the financial markets with many ratings agencies revising their outlook from negative to stable, which was the first upgrade of Croatia's credit rating since 2007. Due to consecutive months of economic growth and the demand for labour, plus the outflows of residents to other European countries, Croatia had recorded the biggest fall in the number of unemployed during the month of November 2016 from 16.1% to 12.7%.

2020– present

2020 
COVID-19 Pandemic has caused more than 400,000 workers to file for economic aid of 4000.00 HRK./month. In the first quarter of 2020, Croatian GDP rose by 0.2% but then in Q2 Government of Croatia announced the biggest quarterly GDP plunge of -15.1% since GDP has been measured. Economic activity also plunged in Q3 2020 when GDP slid by an additional -10.0%.

In autumn 2020 European Commission estimated total GDP loss in 2020 to be -9.6%. Growth was set to pick up in the last month of Q1 2021 and the second quarter of 2021 respectively +1.4% and +3.0%, meaning that Croatia was set to reach 2019 levels by 2022.

2021 
In July 2021 projection was improved to 5.4% due to the strong outturn in the first quarter and the positive high-frequency indicators concerning consumption, construction, industry and tourism prospects. In November 2021 Croatia outperformed these projections and the real GDP growth was calculated to be 8.1% for the year 2021, improving its projection of 5.4% GDP growth made in July. The recovery was supported by strong private consumption, the better-than-expected performance of tourism and the ongoing resilience of the export sector. Preliminary data point to tourism-related expenditure already exceeding 2019 levels, which has been supportive of both employment and consumption. Exports of goods have also continued to perform strongly (up 43%yoy in 2Q21) pointing to resilient competitiveness. Expressed in euros, Croatian merchandise exports in the first nine months of 2021 amounted to 13.3 billion euros, an annual increase of 24.6 per cent. At the same time, imports rose 20.3 per cent to 20.4 billion euros. The coverage of imports by exports for the first nine months is 65.4 per cent. This made 2021 Croatian export's record year as the score from 2019 was exceeded by 2 billion euros.

Exports recovered in all major markets, more precisely with all EU countries and CEFTA countries. Specifically, on the EU market, only a lower export result is recorded in relations with Sweden, Belgium and Luxembourg. Italy is again the main market for Croatian products, followed by Germany and Slovenia. Apart from the high contribution of crude oil that Ina sends to Hungary to the Mol refinery for processing, the export of artificial fertilizers from Petrokemija also has a significant contribution to growth.

For 2022, the Commission revised downwards its projection for Croatia's economic growth to 5.6% from 5.9% previously predicted in July 2021. Commission again confirmed that the volume of Croatia's GDP should reach its 2019 level during 2022, while in 2023 the GDP will grow by 3.4%. The Commission warned that the key downside risks stem from Croatia's relatively low vaccination rates, which could lead to stricter containment measures, and continued delays of the earthquake-related reconstruction. On the upside, Croatia's entry into the Schengen area and euro adoption towards the end of the forecast period could benefit investment and trade.

On Friday, 12 November 2021 Fitch raised Croatia's credit rating by one level, from ‘BBB-‘ to ‘BBB’, Croatia's highest credit rating in history, with a positive outlook, noting progress in preparations for Eurozone membership and a strong recovery of the Croatian economy from the pandemic crisis. This is also secured by the failure of the eurosceptic party Hrvatski Suverenisti in a bid on the referendum to block Euro adoption in Croatia. In December 2021 Croatia's industrial production increased for the thirteenth consecutive month, observing the  growth of production increasing in all of the five aggregates. meaning that  industrial production in 2021 increased by 6.7 percent.

2022 
In late March 2022 Croatian Bureau of Statistics announced that Croatia's industrial output rose by 4% in February, thus growing for 15 months in a row. Croatia continued to have strong growth during 2022 fuelled by tourism revenue and increased exports. According to a preliminary estimate, Croatia's GDP in Q2 grew by 7.7% from the same period of 2021. The International Monetary Fund (IMF) projected in early September 2022 that Croatia's economy will expand by 5.9% in 2022, whilst EBRD expects Croatian GDP growth to reach 6.5% by the end of 2022. Pfizer announced launching a new production plant in Savski Marof whilst Croatian IT industry grew 3.3% confirming the trend that started with Coronavirus pandemic where the Croatia's digital economy increased by 16 percent on average annually from 2019 to 2021. It is estimated that by 2030 its value could reach 15 percent of GDP, with the ICT sector being the main driver of that growth.

On 12 July 2022, the Eurogroup approved Croatia becoming the 20th member of the Eurozone, with the formal introduction of the Euro currency to take place on 1 January 2023.
Croatia was also set to join the Schengen Area in 2023. By 2023, the minimum wage is ostensibly expected to rise to NET 700 EUR, increasing consumer spending.

Sectors

Industry

Tourism

Tourism is a notable source of income during the summer and a major industry in Croatia. It dominates the Croatian service sector and accounts for up to 20% of Croatian GDP. Annual tourist industry income for 2011 was estimated at €6.61 billion. Its positive effects are felt throughout the economy of Croatia in terms of increased business volume observed in retail business, processing industry orders and summer seasonal employment. The industry is considered an export business, because it significantly reduces the country's external trade imbalance. Since the conclusion of the Croatian War of Independence, the tourist industry has grown rapidly, recording a fourfold rise in tourist numbers, with more than 10 million tourists each year. The most numerous are tourists from Germany, Slovenia, Austria and the Czech Republic as well as Croatia itself. Length of a tourist stay in Croatia averages 4.9 days.

The bulk of the tourist industry is concentrated along the Adriatic Sea coast. Opatija was the first holiday resort since the middle of the 19th century. By the 1890s, it became one of the most significant European health resorts. Later a large number of resorts sprang up along the coast and numerous islands, offering services ranging from mass tourism to catering and various niche markets, the most significant being nautical tourism, as there are numerous marinas with more than 16 thousand berths, cultural tourism relying on appeal of medieval coastal cities and numerous cultural events taking place during the summer. Inland areas offer mountain resorts, agrotourism and spas. Zagreb is also a significant tourist destination, rivalling major coastal cities and resorts.

Croatia has unpolluted marine areas reflected through numerous nature reserves and 99 Blue Flag beaches and 28 Blue Flag marinas. Croatia is ranked as the 18th most popular tourist destination in the world. About 15% of these visitors (over one million per year) are involved with naturism, an industry for which Croatia is world-famous. It was also the first European country to develop commercial naturist resorts.

Agriculture
Croatian agricultural sector subsists from exports of blue water fish, which in recent years experienced a tremendous surge in demand, mainly from Japan and South Korea. Croatia is a notable producer of organic foods and much of it is exported to the European Union. Croatian wines, olive oil and lavender are particularly sought after. Value of Croatia's agriculture sector is around 3.1 billion according to preliminary data released by the national statistics office.

Croatia has around 1.72 million hectares of agricultural land, however totally utilized land for agricultural in 2020 was around 1.506 million hectares, of these permanent pasture land constituted 536 000 hectares or some 35.5% of total land available to agriculture. Croatia imports significant quantity of fruits and olive oil, despite having large domestic production of the same. In terms of livestock Croatian agriculture had some 15.2 million poultry, 453 000 Cattle, 802 000 Sheep, 1.157 000 Pork/Pigs,88 000 Goats. Croatia also produced 67 000 tons of blue fish, some 9000 of these are Tuna fish, which are farmed and exported to Japan, South Korea and United States.

Croatia produced in 2022:

 1.66 million tons of maize;
 970 thousand tons of wheat;
 524 thousand tons of sugar beet (the beet is used to manufacture sugar and ethanol);
 319 thousand tons of barley;
 196 thousand tons of soybean;
 107 thousand tons of potato;
 59 thousand tons of rapeseed;
 146 thousand tons of grape;
 154 thousand tons of sunflower seed;

In addition to smaller productions of other agricultural products, like apple (93 thousand tons), triticale (62 thousand tons) and olive (34 thousand tons).

Infrastructure

Transport

The highlight of Croatia's recent infrastructure developments is its rapidly developed motorway network, largely built in the late 1990s and especially in the 2000s. The busiest motorways are the A1, connecting Zagreb to Split and the A3, passing east–west through northwest Croatia and Slavonia. A widespread network of state roads in Croatia acts as motorway feeder roads while connecting all major settlements in the country. The high quality and safety levels of the Croatian motorway network were tested and confirmed by several EuroTAP and EuroTest programs.

The most significant railways in Croatia are found within the Pan-European transport corridors Vb and X connecting Rijeka to Budapest and Ljubljana to Belgrade, both via Zagreb. All rail services are operated by Croatian Railways.

There are international airports in Zagreb, Zadar, Split, Dubrovnik, Rijeka, Osijek and Pula. As of January 2011, Croatia complies with International Civil Aviation Organization aviation safety standards and the Federal Aviation Administration upgraded it to Category 1 rating.

The busiest cargo seaport in Croatia is the Port of Rijeka and the busiest passenger ports are Split and Zadar. In addition to those, a large number of minor ports serve an extensive system of ferries connecting numerous islands and coastal cities in addition to ferry lines to several cities in Italy. The largest river port is Vukovar, located on the Danube, representing the nation's outlet to the Pan-European transport corridor VII.

Energy

The system has a capacity of 20 million tonnes per year. The natural gas transportation system comprises  of trunk and regional natural gas pipelines, and more than 300 associated structures, connecting production rigs, the Okoli natural gas storage facility, 27 end-users and 37 distribution systems.

Croatian production of energy sources covers 85% of nationwide natural gas demand and 19% of oil demand. In 2008, 47.6% of Croatia's primary energy production structure comprised use of natural gas (47.7%), crude oil (18.0%), fuel wood (8.4%), hydro power (25.4%) and other renewable energy sources (0.5%). In 2009, net total electrical power production in Croatia reached 12,725 GWh and Croatia imported 28.5% of its electric power energy needs. The bulk of Croatian imports are supplied by the Krško Nuclear Power Plant in Slovenia, 50% owned by Hrvatska elektroprivreda, providing 16% of Croatia's electricity.

Electricity:
 production: 14.728 GWh (2021)
 consumption: 18.869 GWh (2021)
 exports: 7.544 GWh (2021)
 imports: 11.505 GWh (2021)

Electricity – production by source:
 hydro: 26% (2022)
 thermal: 24% (2022)
 nuclear: 14% (2022)
 renewable: 8% (2022)
 import: 28% (2022)

Crude oil:
 production: 615 thousand tons (2021)
 consumption: 2.456 million tons (2021)
 exports: 472 thousand tons (2021)
 imports: 2.300 million tons (2021)
 proved reserves:  (2017)

Natural gas:
 production: 746 million m³ (2021)
 consumption: 2.906 billion m³ (2021)
 exports: 126 million m³ (2021)
 imports: 2.291 billion m³ (2021)
 proved reserves: 21.094 billion m³ (2019)

Stock exchanges

 Zagreb Stock Exchange

Banking

Central bank:
 Croatian National Bank

Major commercial banks:
 Zagrebačka banka (owned by UniCredit from Italy)
 Privredna banka Zagreb (owned by Intesa Sanpaolo from Italy)
 Hrvatska poštanska banka
 OTP Banka (owned by OTP Bank from Hungary)
 Raiffeisen Bank Austria (owned by Raiffeisen from Austria)
 Erste & Steiermärkische Bank (former Riječka banka, owned by Erste Bank from Austria)

Central Budget

 Overall Budget:
Revenues:
 187.30 billion kuna (€24.83 billion), 2023
Expenditures:
 200.92 billion kuna (€26.63 billion), 2023

Expenditure by ministries for 2023:
 Labor and Pension System, Family and Social Policy – €8.12 billion
 Finance – €6.64 billion
 Science and Education – €3.41 billion
 Health – €2.72 billion
 Economy and Sustainable Development – €1.96 billion
 Maritime Affairs, Transport and Infrastructure – €1.41 billion
 Agriculture – €1.16 billion
 Interior – €1.05 billion
 Defence – €1.04 billion
 Justice and Public Administration – €0.54 billion
 Construction, Physical Planning and State Property – €0.51 billion
 Regional Development and EU funds – €0.50 billion
 Culture and Media – €0.42 billion
 Tourism and Sport – €0.17 billion
 Veterans' Affairs – €0.16 billion
 Foreign and European Affairs – €0.13 billion

Economic indicators
The following table shows the main economic indicators for the period 2000–2022 according to the Croatian Bureau of Statistics.

From the CIA World Factbook 2021.

Real GDP (purchasing power parity):
$107.11 billion (2020 est.)

Real GDP growth rate:
2.94% (2019 est.)

Real GDP per capita:
$26,500 (2020 est.)

GDP (official exchange rate): $60,687 billion (2019 est.)

Labor force:
1.656 million (2020 est.)

Labor force – by occupation:
agriculture 1.9%, industry 27.3%, services 70.8% (2017)

Unemployment rate:
8.07% (2019 est.)

Population below poverty line:
18.3% (2018 est.)

Household income or consumption by percentage share:
lowest 10%:
2.7%
highest 10%:
23%
(2015 est.)

Distribution of family income – Gini index:
30.4 (2017)

Inflation rate (consumer prices):
0.7% (2019 est.)

Budget:
revenues:
$25.24 billion (2017 est.)
expenditures:
$24.83 billion, (2017 est.)

Public debt:
77.8% of GDP (2017 est.)

Taxes and revenues: 46.1% (of GDP) (2017 est.)

Agricultural products:
maize, wheat, sugar beet, milk, barley, soybeans, potatoes, pork, grapes, sunflower seed

Industries:
chemicals and plastics, machine tools, fabricated metal, electronics, pig iron and rolled steel products, aluminum, paper, wood products, construction materials, textiles, shipbuilding, petroleum and petroleum refining, food and beverages, tourism

Industrial production growth rate:
1.2% (2017 est.)

Current account balance:
$1.597 billion (2019 est.)

Exports:
$23.66 billion (2020 est.)

Exports – commodities:
refined petroleum, packaged medicines, cars, medical cultures/vaccines, lumber (2019)

Exports – partners:
Italy 13%,
Germany 13%,
Slovenia 10%,
Bosnia and Herzegovina 9%,
Austria 6%,
Serbia 5% (2019)

Imports:
$27.59 billion (2020 est.)

Imports – commodities:
crude petroleum, cars, refined petroleum, packaged medicines, electricity (2019)

Imports – partners:
Germany 14%,
Italy 14%,
Slovenia 11%,
Hungary 7%,
Austria 6%
(2019)

Reserves of foreign exchange and gold:
$18.82 billion (31 December 2017 est.)

Debt – external:
$48.263 billion (2015 est.)

Currency:
kuna (HRK)

Exchange rates:
kuna per US$1 –
6.2474 (2020)

Gross Domestic Product

See also
 Economy of Europe
 Areas of Special State Concern (Croatia)
 Croatia and the euro
 Croatia and the World Bank
 Croatian brands
 Taxation in Croatia

References

External links

 Croatian National Bank
 Croatian Chamber of Economy
 GDP per inhabitant varied by one to six across the EU27 Member States
 Tariffs applied by Croatia as provided by ITC's ITCMarket Access Map , an online database of customs tariffs and market requirements.

 
Croatia
Croatia
Croatia